Kaskitayo is a residential area in the southwest portion of the City of Edmonton in Alberta, Canada. It was established in 1973 through Edmonton City Council's adoption of the Kaskitayo Outline Plan, which guides the overall development of the area.

Neighbourhoods 
The Kaskitayo Outline Plan originally planned for eight separate neighbourhoods and a special study area. Today, the Kaskitayo area includes the following:
Bearspaw;
Blue Quill;
Blue Quill Estates;
Ermineskin;
Keheewin;
Skyrattler;
Steinhauer;
Sweet Grass; and
Twin Brooks.

Land use plans 
In addition to the Kaskitayo Outline Plan, the following plans were adopted to further guide development of certain portions of the Kaskitayo area:
the Running Creek Neighbourhood Structure Plan in 1987, which applies to the portion of the Twin Brooks neighbourhood east of 111 Street; and
the Twin Brooks Neighbourhood Area Structure Plan in 1982, which applies to the portion of the Twin Brooks neighbourhood west of 111 Street.

Surrounding areas

References 

Neighbourhoods in Edmonton